KSCM-LP (channel 18) was a low-power television station in Bryan, Texas, United States, which was affiliated with the Spanish-language Telemundo network. Owned by Raycom Media, the station was a simulcast of the second digital subchannel of Waco-licensed ABC affiliate KXXV (channel 25) and its Bryan-based semi-satellite KRHD-CD (channel 40). KSCM-LP's transmitter was located northwest of Bryan on US 190/SH 6 in unincorporated southern Robertson County.

History
In April 2006, Drewry Communications reached an agreement with R. D. Harris to purchase KSCM-LP for a reported $125,000. On August 10, 2015, Raycom Media announced that it would purchase Drewry Communications for $160 million. The sale was completed on December 1.

Raycom Media surrendered the station's license for cancellation on November 14, 2017. It had a construction permit to flash-cut to digital on channel 18; these facilities were never built.

References

Television stations in Texas
Bryan, Texas
Spanish-language television stations in Texas
Television channels and stations established in 1996
1996 establishments in Texas
Television channels and stations disestablished in 2017
2017 disestablishments in Texas
Defunct television stations in the United States
SCM-LP